Sara Fantini (born 16 September 1997) is an Italian female hammer thrower. She competed at the 2020 Summer Olympics, in Hammer throw.

Career
She has won eight national championships at senior level, and ranked in the top 60, at 51st place, on the IAAF world leading list at the end of the 2017 outdoor season. She is the daughter of the former shot putter Corrado Fantini.

In 2019 her personal record 70.30 m, besides being the 32nd result of the world lists of the year (which allowed her to be invited by the IAAF for the 2019 World Athletics Championships thanks to the target numbers), and national record under 23 , is also the 4th best all-time Italian performance.

National records
 Hammer throw: 75.77 m, ( Madrid, 18 June 2022) - Current holder
 Hammer throw under-23: 70.30 m ( Livorno, 29 June 2019)

Progression
Her personal best is 75.77 m established in 2022.

Achievements

National titles
Fantini has won nine national championships.

Italian Athletics Championships
Hammer throw: 2017, 2018, 2019, 2020, 2021 (5)
Italian Winter Throwing Championships
Hammer throw: 2017, 2018, 2019, 2021 (4)

See also
Italian all-time lists - Hammer throw

Notes

References

External links
 

1997 births
Living people
Italian female hammer throwers
People from Fidenza
Athletics competitors of Centro Sportivo Carabinieri
Italian Athletics Championships winners
World Athletics Championships athletes for Italy
Athletes (track and field) at the 2020 Summer Olympics
Olympic athletes of Italy
Sportspeople from the Province of Parma
European Athletics Championships medalists
21st-century Italian women